This is a list of the operas written by the French composer François-Adrien Boieldieu (1775–1834). All premieres took place in Paris unless otherwise indicated.

List

See also 
 List of compositions by François-Adrien Boieldieu

References 

Sources
 Forbes, Elizabeth (1992), 'Boieldieu, Adrien' in The New Grove Dictionary of Opera, ed. Stanley Sadie (London) 
 List of works from Musicologie.org, accessed 30 October 2009
 Wild, Nicole; Charlton, David (2005). Théâtre de l'Opéra-Comique Paris: répertoire 1762-1972. Sprimont, Belgium: Editions Mardaga. .

 
Lists of operas by composer
Lists of compositions by composer